The Mobile Wave: How Mobile Intelligence Will Change Everything is a 2012 nonfiction book by the technologist Michael J. Saylor, founder, chairman, and CEO of MicroStrategy, Inc. The Mobile Wave provides an analysis of then-current trends in mobile technology from the point of view of a scholar of the history of science. The book argues that mobile devices will become essential tools for life in the modern day, changing how businesses operate and how industries and economies are powered.

In The Mobile Wave: How Mobile Intelligence Will Change Everything, Saylor argues that mobile technology will change how people live worldwide, affecting businesses, entire industries, and the very economies they power.

Saylor has also been featured in Forbes and CNN for the ideas presented in his book.

Synopsis
Chapter 1 - The Wave: The Shape of the Wave lays the foundation for some of the themes that occur throughout the book.  These include the universal nature of mobile devices, and how mobile and cloud computing technologies will continue to disrupt established industries and the old ways of doing business.  This chapter also introduces the ongoing Information Revolution as the third great revolution to transform society, after the Agricultural and Industrial Revolutions.

Chapter 2 - Computers: The Evolution to Mobile Computing discusses the four great waves of computing described by technologists as leading to the fifth mobile wave: the mainframe, the minicomputer, the personal computer and the Internet PC.  Saylor writes that a critical turning point unleashing the mobile wave was triggered by Apple, with the introduction of the affordable iPhone and its App Store, multi-touch capabilities and built-in GPS.

Chapter 3 - Paper: The Demise of Paper covers a short history of media delivery systems, ranging from the first clay tablets around 3000 B.C., up to the highly disruptive electronic content transforming the print industry.  The chapter also discusses the benefits of electronic publishing, from distribution efficiencies that save money and protect the environment, to display format flexibility making the content more appealing.

Chapter 4 – Entertainment: The New Universal Screen describes how mobile technology has evolved to display movies, TV programming and video games.  The impact of content mobility on advertisers is also discussed.

Chapter 5 – Wallet: A Smarter Wallet and Intelligent Money covers a short history of money and payment systems, and describes the effect the mobile wave is having on banking systems, including offering greater security.

Chapter 6 – Social Networks: A Mobile Social World discusses how evolving mobile/social applications are changing society, including their impact on events ranging from 2010’s unrest in the Middle East, to the social activities of today’s teenagers.

Chapter 7 – Medicine: The New Landscape of Global Healthcare describes the impact of mobile technology on the medical industry.  Topics include the wide benefits of Telemedicine, improvements to medical record keeping, and technical advances to assist sight and hearing impaired people.

Chapter 8 – Education: Remaking Education for Everyone covers the positive disruption mobile technology brings to the education system.  Expanded access to affordable education along with improved learning and retention using mobile content are shown as two ways the mobile wave is improving education.

Chapter 9 – Developing World: Bootstrapping the Developing World highlights the benefits of mobile technology on Third World countries.   By facilitating an improved communications infrastructure, launching more secure, less corrupt financial transaction systems and enabling businesses to more easily sell their products where there’s higher demand, the developing world is already enjoying the benefits of the Mobile Wave.

Chapter 10 – New World: Human Energy Unleashed ties the book’s themes together again, including reiterating the transformative effects on business and society of mobile technology.  The privacy issue is touched upon, along with a suggestion that perhaps an electronic bill of rights type document could be useful to help navigate these issues.

Reception
The Mobile Wave has been featured on several book bestseller lists:
Ranked #5 on The Wall Street Journal Bestseller list on July 15, 2012 in the Hardcover Business category.
Debuted on The New York Times Bestseller list at position #31 in Hardcover Nonfiction the week of July 23, 2012, and ranked in position #5 in Hardcover Business in August 2012.
Ranked #1 in The Washington Post DC-area Bestsellers list in August 2012.

In USA Today, reviewer Jeanne Destro writes, 

The Washingtonian review of the book cited Saylor's vision for the future:

References

2012 non-fiction books
Technology books
Popular science books